Ron Rubin is the name of:
Ron Rubin (voice actor) (born 1959), Canadian voice actor
Ron Rubin (bridge) (born 1948), American bridge player